Now and Forever is a 2006 South Korean film directed by Kim Seong-joong and starring Choi Ji-woo, Jo Han-sun, Choi Sung-kook and Seo Young-hee.it also has a Japanese manga named RENRI NO EDA (連理の枝) Intertwined Branches .

Plot summary
Min-su (played by Jo) is a playboy. With his attractive looks, money and position as a CEO of a game company, he can easily lure women he likes and simply enjoys casual relationships with them. His life, however, reaches a turning point when Hye-won (Choi) enters the scene.

At first, she is nothing more than one of many women he has met, but as he gets to know her he realizes that he is in love, which he has never experienced before.

Although Hye-won has to spend most of her time at hospital due to a fatal disease, she is always cheerful and not discouraged with her misfortune and tries to enjoy life. Mysteriously, Hye-won does not give any signs that she is dying until their relationship is in full bloom. As the story progresses, Min-su learns about the true meaning of love and Hye-won has the best time of her life, thanks to him.

Cast 
 Choi Ji-woo as Han Hye-won
 Jung Da-bin as young Hye-won
 Jo Han-sun as Min-su
 Choi Sung-kook
 Seo Young-hee
 Son Hyun-joo as Section chief Min

References

External links 
 
 
 

2006 films
2006 romantic drama films
South Korean romantic drama films
Films set in Jeju
Films shot in Jeju
2000s Korean-language films
2000s South Korean films